Dennis M. Norman (born January 26, 1980) is a former American football guard. He was drafted by the Seattle Seahawks in the seventh round of the 2001 NFL Draft. He played college football at Princeton.

Norman has also played for the Jacksonville Jaguars and San Diego Chargers.

Early years
Norman attended Cherokee High School in the Marlton section of Evesham Township, New Jersey and was a good student and a letterman in football, basketball, and track & field. As a student, he was a member of the National Honor Society and was a National Merit Scholar. In track&field, he was a three-year letterman and an All-South Jersey selection. Norman graduated from Cherokee High School in 1997.

College career
He was a three-year letterwinner at Princeton University.  Norman was named first-team All-Ivy League his final three seasons.  He started 26 of 29 career games played and is one of only four players to be named All-Ivy League three times. He was also a member of the track and field team, and ranks 5th all-time for the school in the discus with a throw of 175'11"

Professional career

Seattle Seahawks
Norman was drafted in the 2001 NFL Draft by the Seattle Seahawks. He was the only tackle and the sixth player overall ever drafted from Princeton.

Norman played nearly four seasons with the Seahawks before being waived on October 15, 2004.

Jacksonville Jaguars
Norman was signed by the Jacksonville Jaguars on December 7, 2004. He was released on September 8, 2009 after the team signed offensive lineman Kynan Forney.

San Diego Chargers
Norman was signed by the San Diego Chargers on September 16, 2009. After the 2009 season Norman was not re-signed.

References

External links
Jacksonville Jaguars bio

1980 births
Living people
Cherokee High School (New Jersey) alumni
People from Evesham Township, New Jersey
Players of American football from Philadelphia
Players of American football from New Jersey
American football offensive tackles
American football offensive guards
American football centers
Princeton Tigers football players
Seattle Seahawks players
Jacksonville Jaguars players
San Diego Chargers players